Charles Cook (born 12 October 1972) is a professional football manager and former player.

Club career
He played for English non-league sides Maidenhead United, Hampton & Richmond Borough, Ware F.C. and Hitchin Town. He also played for Grange Quins in the MacWhirter Welsh Football League Division Two, while he coached part-time with the Cardiff City youth academy. Previously, he worked with the Cardiff City Ladies at Ninian Park before they were disbanded and he was reassigned to the Academy. Currently he is a coach at Cardiff City.

International career
Cook qualified to play for the Turks and Caicos Islands national football team through four-year residency from 1999 to 2003 while he played for the KPMG United FC. He had moved from the British Virgin Islands national football team where he was a technical director alongside coach Gary White.

He made his playing debut for Turks and Caicos in a March 2000 FIFA World Cup qualification match against Saint Kitts and Nevis and earned a total of 7 caps, scoring no goals. He represented the country in 6 World Cup qualification games. While playing for Turks and Caicos, Charlie received the Golden Boot at the first ever National Soccer Resort tournament in Miami, January 2003.

In 2006, he was appointed coach of the Turks and Caicos Islands national football team.

References

External links

Profile at Soccerpunter.com

1972 births
Living people
Place of birth missing (living people)
Association football midfielders
English footballers
Turks and Caicos Islands footballers
Turks and Caicos Islands international footballers
Maidenhead United F.C. players
Hampton & Richmond Borough F.C. players
Ware F.C. players
Hitchin Town F.C. players
KPMG United FC players
Cardiff Grange Harlequins A.F.C. players
English football managers
Turks and Caicos Islands football managers
Cardiff City F.C. non-playing staff
Turks and Caicos Islands national football team managers